Kuala Belait (KB;) is the administrative town of Belait District, Brunei. The population of the town proper was 4,259 in 2016. Kuala Belait is officially a municipal area, as well as a village under the mukim of the same name. It is also in the westernmost part of country, near the mouth of the Belait River.

History

In 1914, a  road connecting Kuala Belait and Brunei Town was completed. Kuala Belait was a small fishing village at the turn of the 20th century. The natives were Belait Malays who were mainly fishermen. There was a disagreement between the two groups of settlers which caused one of those groups to the relocated up to the west bank of the mouth of the Belait River. The village is now known as Sungai Teraban.

The Kuala Belait Sanitary Board was established in 1929, and this marked the transition of Kuala Belait from a village to a town. In 1930, British Malayan Petroleum Company (BMPC) constructed a telephone line along the Belait coastline which linked up Seria and Rasau with their main headquarters in Kuala Belait. A hospital was built by BMPC and completed in 1931, followed by the first private English school being built that same year. Telephone lines stretching from Kuala Belait to Tutong was dismantled in 1934 after failing to meet expectations. By 1939, pipelines and roads between the town and Miri has been constructed.

On December 16, 1941, the town was captured after an amphibious assault was carried out at Belait Beach by 10,000 soldiers from the Japanese Kawaguchi Detachment and remained part of the Japanese occupation of British Borneo during World War II. Moreover during the Japanese occupation of Kuala Belait, war crimes such as massacre and execution of Indian prisoners of war (POW) of the 2/15th Punjab Regiment were committed out by the Japanese. It can also be noted that 55 Indian prisoners died from starvation in the POW camp in town. As part of Operation Oboe Six, the Australian 9th Division arrived in Kuala Belait on June 24, 1945, followed by the recapturing of the port of Kuala Belait. Reconstruction plans for the destroyed town were approved in 1949. Within the same year, a new church in town was consecrated.

Due to the increase in profits from the oil industry in the 1950s and 1960s, rapid development was seen throughout Kuala Belait. During the 1962 Brunei revolt, rebels of the TKNU managed to gain control of the town, but was soon liberated by the 1/2nd Battalion Gurkha Rifles Regiment. Siege by the rebels against the town's police station were repelled by the local police force. After independence from Britain in 1984, a number of new government buildings were constructed to house the local services of the Brunei government. In 1990s, the two-lane road along the coast leading from Muara to Kuala Belait was upgraded to 4-lane.

Governance

Administrative division 

The area of Kuala Belait comprises territorial division which can be informally grouped into three main areas: Pekan Kuala Belait or Kuala Belait Town, and Kampong Pandan and Mumong suburbs. The latter two areas are further divided into three and two kampongs or villages respectively. Pekan Kuala Belait is also officially a kampong-level administrative division. All of the villages constitute almost all of Mukim Kuala Belait, a subdistrict of Belait.

Local authority and town definition 
The town of Kuala Belait is administered under Jabatan Bandaran Kuala Belait dan Seria (Kuala Belait and Seria Municipal Department), a government department under Kementerian Hal Ehwal Dalam Negeri (the Ministry of Home Affairs). The department comprises Lembaga Bandaran or the Municipal Board, which is headed by Pengerusi Lembaga Bandaran (Chairman of the Municipal Board). The current chairman is Ridzuan Haji Ahmad.

Overlapping territory 
The area under the authority of the Municipal Department overlaps with that under Jabatan Daerah Belait or the Belait District Office. The municipal area consists of Pekan Kuala Belait, the whole of Kampong Pandan suburb, and parts of Mumong suburb. However, all of the kampongs are also under the governance of the Belait District Office, since they constitute the proper subdivisions of the district and subdistricts, and subsequently the headmen of the kampongs, known as ketua kampong (with the exception of Pekan Kuala Belait since there is none assigned), answers to the Pegawai Daerah or District Officer.

Economy

Oil and gas 
Kuala Belait is located in the vicinity of the onshore Rasau gas field. However Brunei Shell has various facilities in town to support the oil and gas production facilities in the vicinity.

The Kuala Belait Bunkering Station (KBBS) is located near the mouth of the Belait River. It supplies domestic gas to the town and other bulk chemicals in support of the various activities. The Kuala Belait Wharf is the main point from which personnel to and from the offshore platforms, off the Belait districts, embark and disembark.

Marine 
The Kuala Belait supply base is located to the south of the wharf, and is the main point for logistics for Shell. The Marine Construction Yard (MCY) in Sungai Duhon, commonly known as SCO, is where construction of marine structures are carried out prior to installation offshore.

Climate
The climate of Kuala Belait is tropical. The weather is warm, humid and rainy all year.

Transportation

Road
Most of the roads within the municipality are surfaced. There are buses taking passengers to Miri from Kuala Belait. The Kuala Belait Highway from the Malaysian border west of Sungai Tujuh, Kuala Belait links up with multiple other highways leading to Bandar Seri Begawan and Muara Town.

Water
It is possible to hire a water taxi at the public wharf close to the Kuala Belait market to go upriver towards Kuala Balai. There are also trips organized by the Kuala Belait Boat Club to sail out in the open sea to various nearby destinations. A timber jetty used to exist in Rasau in 1930.

The Kuala Belait Port is one of the three ports of Brunei. The part of the port near the mouth of the river is operated by Brunei Shell and public entry is restricted. The commercial port of Kuala Belait is located to the south of the municipality in Kampong Sungai Duhon and its environs further upriver from the mouth. Due to silting of the river mouth, the port can only take shallow draft vessels. Two breakwaters have been constructed at the mouth of the Belait River to reduce silting of the river mouth.

Air
Commercial travellers would have to travel to either Bandar Seri Begawan or Miri to catch a commercial flight. There is a helipad at Suri Seri Begawan Hospital.

Education

Primary and secondary 
Primary education is offered in various government and private schools. There are currently three government primary schools:
 Ahmad Tajuddin Primary School
 Paduka Seri Begawan Sultan Omar Ali Saifuddien Primary School
 Pengiran Setia Jaya Pengiran Abdul Momin Primary School
The government also has built three schools which offer secondary education:
 Perdana Wazir Secondary School
 Pengiran Jaya Negara Pengiran Haji Abu Bakar Secondary School
 Sayyidina Ali Secondary School
There are four private schools in Kuala Belait. They may offer primary, secondary or both.
 Chung Hua Middle School, Kuala Belait
 International School Brunei, Kuala Belait
 St. James' School
 St. John's School

Post-secondary 
Secondary students opting for sixth form education study at Pusat Tingkatan Enam Belait. The sixth form students currently share facilities with the secondary students. However, the sixth form is expected to have its own stand-alone campus in the near future.
Alternatively, students opting for vocational education may proceed to study at one of the two post-secondary institution, namely:
 Institute of Brunei Technical Education, Jefri Bolkiah Campus - a government post-secondary institution providing technical and vocational qualifications; and
 Kemuda Institute - a private college that offers Foundation, Diploma and Advanced Diploma courses.

Tourist attractions

Kuala Belait town itself has a number of tourist attractions. Some of these are:

 Silver Jubilee Park is a park built to commemorate the Silver Jubilee of Sultan Hassanal Bolkiah’s accession to the throne, as a gift from the people of Kuala Belait.
 Menara Cendera Kenangan is a monument built to commemorate the Sultan Hassanal Bolkiah's 50th Birthday, along the Belait River.
 Tea Pot Roundabout  (locally known as 'kiri') is a monument in Kampong Pandan sponsored by Brunei Shell Petroleum.
 Belait District Museum is a museum dedicated to the Belait District.
 Kampong Pandan Mosque is a mosque in Kampong Pandan, built in 1994.
 Mohammad Jamalul Alam Mosque is a mosque in Kampong Melayu, built in 1961.
 Istana Kota Manggalela is the residence of the Sultan of Brunei in the Belait District, completed in 1958.
 Belait Beach lies along the coast of Kuala Belait.

Notable people  

Tiger Lim (born 1974), Chinese blogger and YouTube comedian
Zulkhairy Razali (born 1996), Malay footballer who plays striker for Indera SC
Suyoi Osman (born 1952), Brunei politician and minister
Adina Othman (born 1955), Brunei bureaucrat

Notes

External links

Kuala Belait Municipal Board
KEMUDA Institute

Populated places in Brunei
Municipalities in Brunei